The BIM Collaboration Format (BCF) is a structured file format suited to issue tracking with a building information model. BCF is designed primarily for defining views of a building model and associated information on collisions and errors connected with specific objects in the view. The BCF file format allows users of different BIM software, and/or different disciplines to collaborate on issues with the project. The use of the BCF format to coordinate changes to a BIM are an important aspect of OpenBIM.

The format was developed by Tekla and Solibri and later adopted as a standard by buildingSMART. Most major BIM modelling platforms support some integration with BCF, typically through plug-ins provided by the BCF server vendor.

Although BCF was originally conceived as a file base there are now many implementations using the server based collaborative workflow described in the bcfAPI, including an Open Source implementation as part of the Open Source BIMcollective.

Research work has been done in Denmark looking into using BCF for a broader range of information management and exchange in the architecture, engineering and construction (AEC) sector.

Supporting software
There are two main categories of support for BCF. Authoring software and coordination software. Authoring software can generate and share BCF issues. Coordination software is most powerful at coordinating issues and presenting a user interface for management and tracking of issues. Coordination software is typically a web service which allows for easy and real time coordination across multiple authoring software platforms and geographies. Most software has a mix of these functions.

BCF is supported natively by authoring software such as Vectorworks, ArchiCAD, Tekla Structures, Quadri, DDS CAD, BIMcollab ZOOM, BIMsight, Solibri, Navisworks, and Simplebim. Standalone BCF plugins include BCF Manager, and BCFier. Coordination software as cloud services offering BCF based issue tracking include BIMcollab, BIM Track, Vrex, Catenda's Bimsync, Bricks app, and OpenProject.

See also
Industry Foundation Classes
aecXML

References

External links 
 buildingSMART standards library

Building information modeling
Data modeling
Building engineering